Athens RFC is a Greek rugby club in Athens. It is based in Glyka Nera. The club founded in 2004 and it is the most times winner of Greek Championship Rugby Union.

Titles
Greek Championship Rugby Union (6): 2006, 2007, 2008, 2009, 2010, 2011

References

External links
Athens RFC

Greek rugby union teams
Sports clubs in Athens